Claudia Razzi (born March 30, 1962) is an Italian voice actress.

Biography
Razzi often contributes to voicing characters in cartoons, anime, movies, and more content. She is well known for providing the voice of Francine Smith in the Italian-language version of the animated series American Dad! She also voices Vicky in the Italian-language version of the Nickelodeon animated series The Fairly OddParents and Cleo in the Italian dub of Heathcliff and the Catillac Cats.

She works at C.D. Cine Dubbing, Pumaisdue, Dubbing Brothers, and other dubbing studios in Italy.

Voice work

Anime and animation
 Francine Smith in American Dad!
 Blaineley in Total Drama
 Cleo in Heathcliff and the Catillac Cats
 Vicky in The Fairly OddParents
 Mai Kirifuda in Duel Masters
 Oyuki (Episode 8) and Ran (Episodes 60 and 77) in Urusei Yatsura
 Doreen Nickle in The Ant Bully
 Hitomi Kisugi in Cat's Eye
 Miriam in Winx Club: The Secret of the Lost Kingdom
 Miriam in Winx Club 3D: Magical Adventure
 Pedro's wife in Excel Saga
 Eri Kagurazaka in Full Metal Panic! The Second Raid
 Claudia Schiffer's head in Futurama
 Ms. Millions in MegaMan NT Warrior
 Maggie's Mom in Maya & Miguel
 Ikuko Tsukino in Sailor Moon (Viz Media redub)
 Larry's Mom in VeggieTales
 Vexus in My Life as a Teenage Robot
 Arnold in Kipper
 Gingerbread Boy in Blue's Clues
 Cleo in Heathcliff (1984 TV series)
 Shereen Pena in Sarah Lee Jones (since 1998)
 Mileena in Invincible Steel Man Daitarn 3 (second dub)
 Big Mama in Sorcerer Hunters
 Diana, the Acrobat in Dungeons & Dragons
 Emily, the Corpse Bride in Corpse Bride
 Hyzenthlay in Watership Down
 Mizuha Miyama in Magic User's Club
 Yūko Ichihara in xxxHolic: A Midsummer Night's Dream
 Yūko Ichihara in The Princess in the Birdcage Kingdom
 Bécassine in Becassine and the Viking Treasure
 Flat Person in ChalkZone

Live action shows and films
 Red Queen in Alice in Wonderland
 Zoe Barnes in Defying Gravity
 Nova in Planet of the Apes (2001 film)
 Brigitte Parker in The Pretender
 Mrs. Lovett in Sweeney Todd: The Demon Barber of Fleet Street
 Switch in The Matrix
 Janice Higgins in Deep Blue Sea
 Odette Toulemonde in Odette Toulemonde
 Anna in The Night Listener
 Fabienne in Pulp Fiction
 Dr. Serena Kogan in Terminator Salvation
 Bella Zygler in The Round Up
 Allegra Cole in Hitch
 Lia in Play It to the Bone
 Norma in 11:14
 Raven Darkholme/Mystique in X-Men
 Raven Darkholme/Mystique in X2
 Raven Darkholme/Mystique in X-Men: The Last Stand
 Kitty Galore in Cats & Dogs: The Revenge of Kitty Galore
 Betty Shin in Stark Raving Mad (2002 film)
 Robin Harris in The Cable Guy
 Nina Cortlandt in All My Children
 Helena Peabody in The L Word
 Mary Haines  in The Women (2008 film)
 Roxanne Torcoletti in Eastwick
 Olga in Onegin
 Carolyn Crumley in Raines
 Meredith King in The Nine Lives of Chloe King
 Lieutenant Ana Ruiz in The Good Guys (2010 TV series)

Work as a dubbing director
 Law Abiding Citizen
 The Body
 Just Like Heaven
 Jack and Sarah
 Bratz: Starrin & Stylin
 Life as We Know It (film)
 The Honeymooners
 Beauty & the Briefcase
 Prom
 American Pie Presents: The Naked Mile
 Brandy & Mr. Whiskers
 The Fourth Kind
 Greek
 Confessions of a Shopaholic
 Orphan
 Dolphin Tale
 The Nutcracker in 3D

See also
 List of American Dad! voice actors

References

External links
 

Living people
Actresses from Rome
Italian voice actresses
Italian voice directors
1962 births